Dr. James W. Hale House, also known as the Hale-Pendleton House, "Temple Knob," and "Temple Hill," was a historic home located at Princeton, Mercer County, West Virginia.  Built about 1885, it was a large, two-story plus basement brick house.  The house had many Gothic Revival features, such as pointed-arch windows with panes divided by simple geometric tracery, gingerbread bargeboards, and a large verandah completely around the west and south elevations. The verandah roof was supported by more than 12 fluted columns and a cornice with dentil molding in the Greek Revival style. The house sat atop Temple Knob, a small rise said to have been used as a signal point by both Union and Confederate soldiers during the American Civil War.

It was listed on the National Register of Historic Places in 1976.

References

Houses on the National Register of Historic Places in West Virginia
Greek Revival houses in West Virginia
Gothic Revival architecture in West Virginia
Houses completed in 1885
Houses in Mercer County, West Virginia
National Register of Historic Places in Mercer County, West Virginia
Princeton, West Virginia